1998 in philosophy

Events 
 The Indian philosopher and economist Amartya Sen was awarded the 1998 Nobel Memorial Prize in Economic Sciences "for his contributions to welfare economics".

Publications 
 Heinz von Foerster and Bernhard Pörksen, Wahrheit ist die Erfindung eines Lügners: Gespräche für Skeptiker (published in German in 1998; not yet published in English)
 John Searle, Mind, Language and Society: Philosophy in the Real World (1998)
 Alan Gewirth, Self-Fulfillment (1998)
 Alessandro Ferrara, Reflective Authenticity: Rethinking the Project of Modernity (1998)
 Robert Audi, Epistemology: A Contemporary Introduction to the Theory of Knowledge (1998)
 T. M. Scanlon, What We Owe to Each Other (1998)

Deaths 
 February 17 - Ernst Jünger (born 1895)
 March 3 - Marc Sautet (born 1947)
 April 21 - Jean-François Lyotard (born 1924)

References 

Philosophy
20th-century philosophy
Philosophy by year